The Good Thief is a 2002 British-French crime comedy film written and directed by Neil Jordan. It is a remake of the French film Bob le flambeur (1955) by Jean-Pierre Melville. The film, shot in both Monaco and Nice, France, follows a heroin-addicted retired thief through the setup and completion of one last job.

Cast

 Nick Nolte as Bob Montagnet
 Emir Kusturica as Vladimir
 Nutsa Kukhianidze as Anne
 Tchéky Karyo as Roger
 Saïd Taghmaoui as Paulo
 Patricia Kell as Yvonne
 Gérard Darmon as Raoul
 Julien Maurel as Philippe
 Sarah Bridges as Philipa
 Ralph Fiennes as Tony Angel (uncredited)

Reception
The film received mostly positive reviews. Critic Roger Ebert notes of Nolte: "it is clear that he was born to play Bob. It is one of those performances that flows unhindered from an actor's deepest instincts."

Reviewer Pam Grady, writing for Reel.com, also praised the film: "The Good Thief has many virtues, beginning with the sheer wit of Jordan's screenplay and Chris Menges's neon-saturated cinematography that renders Nice both beautiful and sinister, trapping the characters in the glare of its lights. The heist itself is a complicated affair — Jordan took Melville's original idea and added a distinctly 21st-century twist — and all the more satisfying for it."

The website's critical consensus reads, "Bolstered by Nolte's strong performance, The Good Thief brims with seductive style." On Metacritic, the film has a weighted average score of 68 out of 100, based on 37 critics, indicating "generally favorable reviews".

Soundtrack

The film's score was composed by Elliot Goldenthal.

References

External links
 
 
 
 
 

2002 films
2000s crime drama films
2002 crime thriller films
2000s heist films
British crime drama films
British crime thriller films
British remakes of French films
British heist films
French crime drama films
French crime thriller films
Remakes of French films
French heist films
Irish crime drama films
Irish crime thriller films
Canadian crime drama films
Canadian crime thriller films
Fox Searchlight Pictures films
2000s English-language films
English-language Canadian films
English-language French films
English-language Irish films
Films about organized crime in France
Films based on works by Auguste Le Breton
Films directed by Neil Jordan
Films scored by Elliot Goldenthal
Films set in France
Films set on the French Riviera
Films shot in France
Films shot in Monaco
British neo-noir films
French neo-noir films
2002 drama films
2000s Canadian films
2000s British films
2000s French films